Placing of Seamen Convention, 1920 is  an International Labour Organization Convention.

It was established in 1920:
Having decided upon the adoption of certain proposals with regard to the "supervision of articles of agreement; provision of facilities for finding employment for seamen; application to seamen of the Convention and Recommendations adopted at Washington in November last in regard to unemployment and unemployment insurance", ...

Ratifications
As of 2013, the convention had been ratified by 41 states. Of the ratifying states, 15 have subsequently denounced the convention, some by a process that automatically denounces the treaty when the same state ratifies a convention that supersedes the 1920 treaty.

References

External links 
Text.
Ratifications and denunciations.

Placing
Treaties concluded in 1920
Treaties entered into force in 1921
Treaties of Argentina
Treaties of Belgium
Treaties of Bosnia and Herzegovina
Treaties of Cameroon
Treaties of Chile
Treaties of Colombia
Treaties of Cuba
Treaties of Djibouti
Treaties of Egypt
Treaties of Estonia
Treaties of the Weimar Republic
Treaties of Israel
Treaties of the Kingdom of Italy (1861–1946)
Treaties of the Empire of Japan
Treaties of Lebanon
Treaties of Mexico
Treaties of Montenegro
Treaties of New Zealand
Treaties of Nicaragua
Treaties of Panama
Treaties of Peru
Treaties of the Kingdom of Romania
Treaties of Serbia and Montenegro
Treaties of Slovenia
Treaties of North Macedonia
Treaties of Uruguay
Admiralty law treaties
Treaties extended to Curaçao and Dependencies
Treaties extended to the Faroe Islands
Treaties extended to the French Southern and Antarctic Lands
1920 in labor relations